Jamie Paulson (born April 26, 1948) is a Canadian former badminton player who won national and international titles from the late 1960s to the mid-1970s.

In 1970 he won the men's singles at the quadrennial 1970 British Commonwealth Games making him the only Canadian to do so. He was the flag bearer for Canada at the 1974 British Commonwealth Games in Christchurch where he finished second to Malaysia's Punch Gunalan. Paulson won men's singles and men's doubles with Yves Pare at the Canadian Open in 1973, and repeated in men's singles in 1974. He was a leading player on Canadian Thomas Cup (men's international) team that reached the inter-zone playoffs in 1970 and 1973.

Achievements

International tournaments 
Men's doubles

References

Canadian male badminton players
Sportspeople from Calgary
1948 births
Living people
Commonwealth Games silver medallists for Canada
Badminton players at the 1974 British Commonwealth Games
Badminton players at the 1970 British Commonwealth Games
Commonwealth Games gold medallists for Canada
Badminton players at the 1972 Summer Olympics
Commonwealth Games medallists in badminton
Medallists at the 1970 British Commonwealth Games
Medallists at the 1974 British Commonwealth Games